HMS Firedrake was a modified , named after the firedrake of Teutonic mythology, and the sixth ship of the Royal Navy to bear the name.

Construction
The "Firedrake Specials", "Special I class" or "Yarrow Specials" were a little larger than the rest of the class but carried the same armament. Firedrake became part of the Royal Navy's 1st Destroyer Flotilla.

Curragh Incident

During the Curragh Incident in the spring of 1914, Firedrake was despatched to Kingstown (now Dún Laoghaire in the Republic of Ireland) in order to preserve communications between Lieutenant General Sir Arthur Paget in Dublin and the British Government in London. She left Southampton at 10:30pm on 19 March, making the passage in record time.  The Unionists suspected that the naval movements were part of a plot to subdue Ulster, and Firedrakes captain, Lieutenant Commander B W Barrow, was ordered to report to Paget's Headquarters in civilian clothes.

Discomfort in the British Army with possible military action within Ireland was to some extent mirrored in the Royal Navy. In Firedrake, Engineer Lieutenant Ranken informed his captain "that I had signed the British Covenant and that I should be no party to any aggressive move against Ulster if that were the intention in sending us to Kingstown". Had General Paget, he declared, "joined for passage during my regime only one course was open to me - to decline to be a party to propelling the ship".  Lieutenant Commander Barrow did not share his principles, and Ranken was relieved by another officer on 22 March.  On 2 April all naval forces, including Firedrake, were withdrawn for Easter leave, with no intention to return them. Although the Royal Navy soon returned to prevent gun-running to the Ulster Volunteers, Firedrake does not appear to have taken part.

World War One
At the start of World War I Firedrake and Lurcher were assigned to the Eighth Submarine Flotilla under the command of Commodore Keyes, and were based at Parkeston Quay, Harwich. Both ships were employed in escorting, towing and exercising with submarines of their flotilla, and the more notable episodes are detailed below:

Landing of the BEF
From August 1914 the British and French Navies attempted to seal the English Channel against German naval attack; Firedrake and 12 submarines formed the north-eastern line. No transports carrying the British Expeditionary Force (BEF) were sunk, although the German Navy made little or no use of submarines against non-military ships at this stage of the war.

According to the despatches of Commodore Keyes,

The Battle of Heligoland Bight

On 26 August 1914 Commodore Keyes hoisted his broad pennant in Lurcher, leading Firedrake, two D-class and six E-class submarines eastwards into the North Sea. Also at sea were the destroyers of Commodore Reginald Tyrwhitt. The plan was to place elements of the High Seas Fleet between Royal Navy surface ships and bottomed Royal Navy submarines. Unknown to Keyes and Tyrwhitt, the Admiralty had added significant reinforcements at the last minute.

Keyes' despatch reads: 

Battle was joined at 7:00 on 28 August in misty conditions.

After the German cruiser  was heavily damaged and disabled, Commodore Goodenough ordered his ships to cease firing on her at 12:55 pm and a rescue operation was undertaken. , accompanied by Firedrake and Lurcher, manoeuvred close to Mainz in an effort to recover the surviving crew. Boats from Liverpool were deployed to retrieve those who had abandoned ship while Lurcher positioned alongside Mainz to transfer the crew who remained on board.  By 1:10pm the Royal Navy ships withdrew as the height of tide was high enough to allow larger Imperial German Navy units to enter the area. Although the operation had been something of a shambles in the mist, the results were clear: Three German light cruisers and a destroyer sunk against no Royal Navy losses.

Submarines in the Baltic
On 22 September 1914 Firedrake and Lurcher towed the submarines  and  towards the Skagerrak.  This was the first act in a long saga that culminated in a British submarine flotilla in the Baltic.

Raid on Scarborough

By 14 December 1914 the Admiralty had advance warning of the intended raid on Scarborough, Hartlepool and Whitby through signals intelligence. Commodore Keyes was ordered to send eight submarines and his two command destroyers, Lurcher and Firedrake, to take stations off the island of Terschelling to catch the German ships should they turn west into the English Channel. On 16 December, as the situation developed, the submarines were ordered to move to the Heligoland Bight in order to intercept returning German ships. As a last-ditch attempt to catch Hipper, the Admiralty ordered Keyes to take his two destroyers and attempt to torpedo Hipper as he returned home around 2 am. on 17 December. Keyes himself had considered this and wanted to try, but the message was delayed and failed to reach him until too late.

Search for submarine C31
On 7 January 1915 both Firedrake and Lurcher carried out a search for the missing British submarine , to little avail; it transpired later that she had been mined off the Belgian coast on 4 January.

Capture of UC-5

On 27 April 1916, the German submarine UC-5, under the command of Oberleutnant zur See Ulrich Mohrbutter, ran aground on Shipwash Shoal in position .  Firedrake captured the U-boat at 1:00pm relatively intact; apart from some damage incurred in the grounding, the crew had taken measures to damage instruments and equipment, including firing small arms at them, and seven destruction charges had caused several holes in the pressure hull. UC-5 was towed to Harwich and placed in a dry dock, where she was examined and reconditioned. She was displayed at Temple Pier on the Thames in London, and later moved to New York, where she was displayed in Central Park.  Firedrakes captain, Commander Aubrey Thomas Tillard was mentioned in despatches for his part in the capture.

Sinking of UC-51
Some sources state that  commanded by Oberleutnant zur See Hans Galster was sunk by Firedrake on 13 November or 17 November 1917, either off Harwich or Start Point.

Disposal
Firedrake survived the war and was sold to J Smith for breaking on 10 October 1921.

Pennant numbers

HMS Firedrake in fiction
"The Man Who Won the War", a 1936 short story by Robert Buckner, featured Roger Bradman as the commanding officer of Firedrake who, in the early days of World War I, lands on the Belgian coast and devises a plan that succeeds in stopping the German Army from reaching Paris. It was first printed in Atlantic Monthly in February 1936, and then reprinted in Reader's Digest (April 1936) and The Best American Short Stories of 1937.

References

 

Acheron-class destroyers of the Royal Navy
Ships built on the River Clyde
1912 ships
World War I destroyers of the United Kingdom